Jai Kishan High School, Bargaon is a State Government educational Institution situated in Bargaon under Khariar Tahasil in Nuapada district, Odisha, India. The school provides education to both boys and girls from Class-VI to Xth. The Institution was established on 3rd July 1972 in Bargaon, Odisha.

It extends teaching facilities in Mathematics, Science, Humanities, Social Sciences as well as Languages like Odia, Hindi, Sanskrit etc. The main objective of this institution is to disseminate knowledge to the Boys and Girls students in different fields. Simultaneously, this institution also aims at the overall development of the Boys and Girls students physical, mental and moral.
Games and Sports are also an integral part of this institution which inspires the student to be physically fit. Computer Education, The Bharat Scouts and Guides, EcoClub, Junior Red Cross etc. are also functioning in this institution for all-round development of the students.

References
JAIKISHAN H.S., BARGAON - Bagraon, District Nuapada (Orissa)
http://rtiodisha.in/Pages/printAllManual/office_id:8684
Schools | Nuapada District,Government of Odisha | India
Jai Kishan High School, Bargaon « HEYSCHOOLS.IN

Log into Facebook | Facebook

High schools and secondary schools in Odisha
1972 establishments in Orissa
Educational institutions established in 1972